Fijnje is a surname. Notable people with the surname include:

 Bobby Fijnje (born  1976), American criminal defendant
 Wybo Fijnje (1750–1809), Dutch Mennonite minister, publisher, and politician

Dutch-language surnames